Gualberto Villarroel is a province in the La Paz Department, Bolivia. Its capital is San Pedro de Curahuara de Carangas.

Subdivision 
The province is divided into three municipalities which are further subdivided into cantons.

External links 
 Map of the Gualberto Villarroel Province

Provinces of La Paz Department (Bolivia)